The Americas Zone is one of the three regional zones of the 2018 Davis Cup.

In the Americas Zone there are three different tiers, called groups, in which teams competed against each other to advance to the upper tier. Winners in Group I advanced to the World Group Play-offs, along with losing teams from the World Group first round. Teams who lost their respective ties competed in the relegation play-offs, with winning teams remaining in Group I, whereas teams who lost their play-offs were relegated to the Americas Zone Group II in 2019.

Participating nations
Seeds: 
The first seed received a bye into the second round.

Remaining nations:

 

Draw

 relegated to Group II in 2019.
 and  advance to World Group Play-off.

First round

Chile vs. Ecuador

Barbados vs. Colombia

Dominican Republic vs. Brazil

Second round

Argentina vs. Chile

Colombia vs. Brazil

1st round play-offs

Dominican Republic vs. Barbados

2nd round play-offs

Barbados vs. Ecuador

References

External links

Official Website

Americas Zone Group I
Davis Cup Americas Zone